The  San Angelo Stampede Express season was the team's seventh season as a professional indoor football franchise and second in the Indoor Football League (IFL). One of twenty-five teams that competed in the IFL for the 2010 season, the San Angelo, Texas-based San Angelo Stampede Express were members of the Lonestar East Division of the Intense Conference.

Under the leadership of head coach Clint Dolezel, the team played their home games at the Foster Communications Coliseum in San Angelo, Texas.

The Stampede Express lost to the Billings Outlaws 38-68 in the Intense Conference quarterfinals.

Schedule

Regular season

Playoffs

Standings

Roster

References

External links
San Angelo Stampede Express official statistics

San Angelo Stampede Express
San Angelo Stampede Express